T. V. Mohandas Pai is a recipient of the Padma Shri, India's fourth highest civilian award conferred by the Government of India and the current Chairperson of Manipal Global Education. He was a former board member at Infosys, and Head – Administration, Education, and Research, Financial, and Human Resources at the Infosys Leadership Institute.

Education
Mohandas did his schooling at St. Joseph's Indian High School, Bangalore. He holds a bachelor's degree in commerce from St. Joseph's College of Commerce, Bangalore and a bachelor's degree in law (LLB) from Bangalore University. He is also a fellow member of Institute of Chartered Accountants of India (ICAI). In 2011, Mohan, an alumnus of Bangalore University, received an offer to co-chair the proposed Bangalore University School of Economics.

Career
Mohandas Pai joined Infosys in 1994 and served as a member of the Board from May 2000 till July 2011. He was the company's CFO from 1994 till 2006. In 2006, he voluntarily resigned from the office of  the CFO to lead efforts in the areas of human resources and education and research.

The Infosys Annual Report, under his supervision, has won the top awards consistently from the Institute of Chartered Accountants and from the South Asian Federation of Accountants.

In 2000, he, along with others, founded the Akshaya Patra Foundation, Bangalore, to start a midday meal program for school children.

He was voted the 'CFO of the Year' in 2001 by IMA India. He won the 'Best CFO in India' award from Finance Asia in the year 2002, and 'Best chief financial officer in India' in the best managed companies poll conducted by AsiaMoney in 2004.

He still holds 728,000 shares of Infosys which were given to him as part of an employee stock ownership plan.

Regulators
Mohandas has been active in working with regulators to improve the business ecosystem. He was also a Member of the Kelkar Committee, constituted by the Ministry of Finance, Government of India, for reforming direct taxes, the Non-Resident Taxation Committee, the high powered committee on E-commerce and Taxation. He served as a Member of the Board of Securities and Exchange Board of India (SEBI) from 12 September to 16 July. He was a Member of the Empowered Committee for setting up the Tax Information Network of the Government of India. He also works with the union government and state governments in the fields of education, IT and business. He has been working with decision makers to improve the quality of education and availability of skilled manpower. He has been recently appointed as the head of the panel formed by Securities and Exchange Board of India (SEBI) to study the impact of fin-tech on securities market.

Memberships
Mohandas is a member of the board of CSIR-Tech Pvt. Ltd. He presently  also sits on the board of the National Stock Exchange of India, India's youngest and second largest securities trading exchange after the BSE and one of the world's largest stock exchanges by market capitalisation.  and Havells India Ltd., one of the largest Indian consumer electrical company.

Additional activities
He is an ardent supporter of the Akshaya Patra Foundation and is one of the members of the board of trustees of Akshaya Patra.

He is an active investor and important part of Indian startup community. He has over 50 investments including Zoomcar,Faircent,Tripfactory, Online Tayari, YourStory, Licious, Justdoc, Mad Street Den, etc.

He is also one of the producers of an animated Sanskrit movie, Punyakoti.

He is a Partner at Aarin Capital, General Partner at Exfinity Venture Partners, General Partner and Advisor at Ideaspring Capital, Partner at StartupXSeed, and an Investor in 3one4Capital.

References

Date of birth missing (living people)
Living people
Indian accountants
Businesspeople from Bangalore
Chief financial officers
Bangalore University alumni
Recipients of the Padma Shri in trade and industry
Recipients of the Rajyotsava Award 2008
Year of birth missing (living people)